Happy Songs for Happy People is the fourth studio album by Scottish post-rock band Mogwai.

Overview
Happy Songs for Happy People represents a further evolution of Mogwai's toned down, more electronic sound: all songs are based on electric guitars and live drums, but synthesizers are used frequently and often take the main stage on this album, with strings and piano also making the occasional appearance.

Mogwai's usual vocalist Stuart Braithwaite does not sing on this album. Barry Burns ("Hunted by a Freak", "Killing All the Flies") and John Cummings ("Boring Machines Disturbs Sleep") accept vocal duties.

Release
The CD release of Happy Songs for Happy People contains a demo version of Cubase and the individual tracks for each instrument in "Hunted by a Freak" allowing remixing and reconstructing of the song.

The pre-release MP3s of the album circulating on the net had a sample of Happy Tree Friends cartoon main theme mixed in at the end of the last track.

A computer animated video was released for the song "Hunted by a Freak", depicting a person throwing pets to their death.

In 2009 it was awarded a gold certification from the Independent Music Companies Association which indicated sales of at least 100,000 copies throughout Europe.

The song "I Know You Are But What Am I?" is used as the closing of Episode 8, Season 1 of the TV show Person of Interest and also appears on The Wicker Man motion picture soundtrack. The song "Kids Will Be Skeletons" was featured in the 2015 video game Life Is Strange as well as episodes of the Netflix series After Life.

Track listing

Personnel

Mogwai
 Dominic Aitchison – bass guitar
 Stuart Braithwaite – guitar
 Martin Bulloch – drums
 Barry Burns – guitar, keyboard, vocoder on "Hunted by a Freak" and "Killing All the Flies"
 John Cummings – guitar, piano, vocals on "Boring Machines Disturbs Sleep"

Additional musicians
 Luke Sutherland – violin on "Killing All the Flies" and "Stop Coming to My House", guitar on "Ratts of the Capital"
 Caroline Barber – cello on "Hunted By a Freak", "Moses? I Amn't" and "Golden Porsche"
 Donald Gillian – cello on "Killing All the Flies"
 Scott Dickinson – viola on "Killing All the Flies"
 Greg Lawson – violin on "Killing All the Flies"

Production
Tony Doogan – production, recording, mixing
Mogwai – production
Michael "Frango" Bannister – assistant engineering
Gavin Lawrie – assistant engineering
Adam Nunn – mastering

Artwork and design
Uncontrollable Urge – cover
Divine Inc – design

Charts

References

2003 albums
Mogwai albums
Matador Records albums
PIAS Recordings albums
Albums produced by Tony Doogan